The African Queen is a television film which aired on CBS on March 18, 1977. It stars Warren Oates as Captain Charlie Allnut and Mariette Hartley as Rose Sayer, roles originated by Humphrey Bogart and Katharine Hepburn in the 1951 film of the same name.

Plot summary
Rather than being a remake, the plot continues after the events of the original story, with Allnut and Sayer being recaptured by the Germans and forced to transport a 75mm cannon.

Cast
 Warren Oates as Capt. Charlie Allnut
 Mariette Hartley as Rose Sayer
 Tyrone Jackson as Kaninu
 Alfred Polsen as Major Strauss
 Wolf Roth as Lt. Biedemeyer
 Frank Schuller as Pvt. Heinke
 Johnny Sekka as Jogana
 Clarence Thomas as Sgt. Abuttu
 Raymond Forchion as African Villager (uncredited)

Reception
Television critic Cecil Smith described the film's concept as "maybe the silliest in the history of the medium." Variety opined that the leads "Both turn in pro jobs but are necessarily haunted by their predecessors."

Though intended to be a pilot for a television series, it received disappointing ratings and was not picked up.

References

External links
 
 
 

1977 television films
1977 films
CBS network films
Films shot in Florida
Television pilots not picked up as a series
Television sequel films
Films directed by Richard C. Sarafian